Vallinfreda is a comune (municipality) in the Metropolitan City of Rome in the Italian region Lazio, located approximately  northeast of Rome.

References

External links
 Official website
 www.vallinfreda.com/

Cities and towns in Lazio